The Northern Ireland Assembly, often referred to by the metonym Stormont, is the devolved legislature of Northern Ireland. It has power to legislate in a wide range of areas that are not explicitly reserved to the Parliament of the United Kingdom, and to appoint the Northern Ireland Executive. It sits at Parliament Buildings at Stormont in Belfast.

The Assembly is a unicameral, democratically elected body comprising 90 members known as Members of the Legislative Assembly (MLAs). Members are elected under the single transferable vote form of proportional representation (STV-PR) In turn, the Assembly selects most of the ministers of the Northern Ireland Executive using the principle of power-sharing under the D'Hondt method to ensure that Northern Ireland's largest voting blocs, British unionists and Irish nationalists, both participate in governing the region. The Assembly's standing orders allow for certain contentious motions to require a cross-community vote; in addition to requiring the support of an overall majority of members, such votes must also be supported by a majority within both blocs in order to pass.

The Assembly is one of two "mutually inter-dependent" institutions created under the 1998 Good Friday Agreement, the other being the North/South Ministerial Council with the Republic of Ireland. The Agreement aimed to end Northern Ireland's violent 30-year Troubles. The first Assembly election was held in June 1998.

History

Previous legislatures
From June 1921 until March 1972, the devolved legislature for Northern Ireland was the Parliament of Northern Ireland, established by the Government of Ireland Act 1920 and meeting from 1932 at Stormont, outside Belfast. The Parliament always had an Ulster Unionist Party (UUP) majority and always elected a UUP administration; it was suspended by the UK Government on 30 March 1972 and formally abolished in 1973 under the Northern Ireland Constitution Act 1973.

Northern Ireland was subsequently administered by direct rule until 1999, with a brief exception in 1974.  Attempts began to restore on a new basis that would see power shared between nationalists and unionists. To this end a new legislature, the Northern Ireland Assembly, was established in 1973 with a power-sharing Executive taking office in January 1974. However, this body was brought down by the Ulster Workers' Council strike in May 1974. Political discussions continued against the continued backdrop of the Troubles. In 1982, another Northern Ireland Assembly was established, initially as a body to scrutinise the actions of the Northern Ireland Civil Service and the Secretary of State, the UK Government minister with responsibility for Northern Ireland. It was not supported by Irish nationalists and was officially dissolved in 1986.

1998–2002
The Northern Ireland (Elections) Act 1998 formally established the Assembly in law under the name New Northern Ireland Assembly, in accordance with the Good Friday (or Belfast) Agreement. The first election of members of the New Northern Ireland Assembly was on 25 June 1998 and it first met on 1 July 1998. However, it only existed in "shadow" form until 2 December 1999 when full powers were devolved to the Assembly. Since then the Assembly has operated with several interruptions and has been suspended on five occasions:
 11 February – 30 May 2000
 10 August 2001 (24-hour suspension)
 22 September 2001 (24-hour suspension)
 14 October 2002 – 7 May 2007
 9 January 2017 – 11 January 2020

Attempts to secure its operation on a permanent basis were initially frustrated by disagreements between the two main unionist parties (the Democratic Unionist Party (DUP) and the Ulster Unionist Party) and Sinn Féin. Unionist representatives refused to participate in the Good Friday Agreement's institutions alongside Sinn Féin until they were assured that the IRA had discontinued its activities, decommissioned its weapons, and disbanded.

2002–2007 (suspension)
The Assembly's suspension from October 2002 to May 2007 occurred when unionist parties withdrew from the Northern Ireland Executive after Sinn Féin's offices at Stormont were raided by police, who were investigating allegations of intelligence gathering on behalf of the IRA by members of the party's support staff. The Assembly, already suspended, was dissolved on 28 April 2003 as scheduled, but the elections due the following month were postponed by the UK Government and were not held until November that year.

Although the Assembly remained suspended from 2002 until 2007, the members elected at the 2003 Assembly election were called together on 15 May 2006 under the Northern Ireland Act 2006 to meet in an Assembly to be technically known as  "the Assembly established under the Northern Ireland Act 2006" for the purpose of electing a First Minister and deputy First Minister and choosing the members of an Executive before 25 November 2006 as a preliminary to the restoration of the Northern Ireland Executive.

Multi-party talks in October 2006 resulted in the St Andrews Agreement, wherein Sinn Féin committed to support the Police Service of Northern Ireland and the mechanism for nominating First and deputy First Ministers was changed.  In May 2006, Ian Paisley, leader of the DUP, had refused Sinn Féin's nomination to be First Minister alongside Sinn Féin's chief negotiator, Martin McGuinness, as deputy First Minister; after the St Andrews Agreement, these positions were now chosen by larger parties only, while the holders of other positions were elected by sitting MLAs. Eileen Bell was appointed by the Secretary of State, Peter Hain, to be the interim speaker of the Assembly, with Francie Molloy and Jim Wells acting as deputy speakers. The Northern Ireland (St Andrews Agreement) Act 2006 repealed the Northern Ireland Act 2006 and disbanded "the Assembly".

The St Andrews Agreement Act provided for a "Transitional Assembly established under the Northern Ireland (St Andrews Agreement) Act 2006" – to continue to contribute to preparations for the restoration of devolved government. A person who was a member of the Northern Ireland Assembly was also a member of the Transitional Assembly, with the same speaker and deputy speaker as elected for "the Assembly". The Transitional Assembly first met on 24 November 2006 but proceedings were suspended due to a bomb threat by loyalist paramilitary Michael Stone. It was dissolved on 30 January 2007 when the election campaign for the next Northern Ireland Assembly started.

Subsequently, a new election to the suspended Northern Ireland Assembly was held on 7 March 2007. The DUP and Sinn Féin consolidated their positions as the two largest parties in the election and agreed to enter government together. Peter Hain signed a restoration order on 25 March 2007 allowing for the restoration of devolution at midnight on the following day. An administration was eventually established on 10 May with Ian Paisley as First Minister and Martin McGuinness as deputy First Minister.

2007–2017 
This third Assembly was the first legislature in Northern Ireland to complete a full term since the Northern Ireland Parliament which convened between 1965 and 1969 and saw powers in relation to policing and justice transferred from Westminster on 12 April 2010. Peter Robinson succeeded Ian Paisley as First Minister and DUP leader in 2008.

A five-year term came into effect with the fourth Assembly elected in 2011.   nd Martin McGuinness as deputy First Minister. The subsequent period was dominated by issues of culture and dealing with the past which culminated in the Fresh Start Agreement in 2014. The first Official Opposition in the Assembly was formed by the UUP in the closing months of the fourth term. Following the election of the fifth Assembly in 2016, the DUP and Sinn Féin formed the fourth Executive, with Arlene Foster as First Minister and Martin McGuinness continuing deputy First Minister.

2017–2020 (suspension) 
In the wake of the Renewable Heat Incentive scandal, McGuinness resigned from his post in January 2017, bringing an end to almost a decade of unbroken devolution. Sinn Féin withdrew from the Assembly, and a fresh election was held on 2 March 2017. Negotiations mediated by then Secretary of State James Brokenshire missed the three-week deadline provided in law for the formation of an Executive. The passing of an extended legal deadline of 29 June left decisions on funding allocations in the hands of the Northern Ireland Civil Service, and a budget for the ongoing 2017–18 financial year was passed by the UK Parliament. Over time, further legislation was passed for Northern Ireland at Westminster, repeatedly extending the deadline for Executive formation although no direct rule ministers were appointed during this suspension. In 2019, the UK Parliament enacted one such Bill to legalise same-sex marriage and liberalise abortion, in line with Great Britain (the rest of the UK) and the Republic of Ireland.

2020–2022 
Talks eventually succeeded under a third Secretary of State Julian Smith. The sixth Assembly resumed on 11 January 2020, shortly before the UK's exit from the European Union.

In February 2021, DUP MLAs threatened to bring down the Assembly and force an early election in protest at Boris Johnson's Brexit deal, which would put a border in the Irish Sea.

On 3 February 2022, First Minister Paul Givan of the DUP resigned. Due to the power-sharing arrangements, this also caused the deputy First Minister to lose her position.

Since 2022 
Elections were held for a seventh assembly in May 2022. Sinn Féin emerged as the largest party, followed by the Democratic Unionist Party. The newly elected assembly met for the first time on 13 May 2022 and again on 30 May. However, at both these meetings, the DUP refused to assent to the election of a speaker as part of a protest against the Northern Ireland Protocol, which meant that the assembly could not continue other business, including the appointment of a new Executive. The incumbent speaker and incumbent ministers would continue in office in caretaker roles.

After the deadline set by Westminster for restoring devolved government was missed, the Northern Ireland secretary must schedule the election in the next 12 weeks. However, the secretary has indicated that they will extend the deadline for the formation of the executive by six weeks, with an option for a further six week extension, so that any Northern Ireland Assembly election that would occur due to a failure to form an executive would happen at some point in 2023.

Powers and functions
The Assembly has both legislative powers and responsibility for electing the Northern Ireland Executive. The First and deputy First Ministers were initially elected on a cross-community vote, although this was changed in 2006 and they are now appointed as leaders of the largest parties of the largest and second largest Assembly 'block' (understood to mean 'Unionist', 'Nationalist' and 'Other').  The Minister of Justice is appointed by cross-community agreement. The seven other ministerial positions are distributed among willing parties roughly proportionate to their share of seats in the Assembly by the D'Hondt method, with ministers chosen by the nominating officers of each party.

The Assembly has authority to legislate in a field of competences known as "transferred matters". These matters are not explicitly given in the Northern Ireland Act 1998. Rather they include any competence not explicitly retained by the Parliament at Westminster. Powers reserved by Westminster are divided into "excepted matters", which it retains indefinitely, and "reserved matters", which may be transferred to the competence of the Northern Ireland Assembly at a future date. A list of transferred, reserved and excepted matters is given below.

While the Assembly was in suspension, its legislative powers were exercised by the UK Government, which governs through procedures at Westminster. Laws that would have normally been within the competence of the Assembly were passed by the UK Parliament in the form of Orders-in-Council rather than Acts of the Assembly.

Further, when the Assembly is suspended, certain devolved matters revert to the remit of the British–Irish Intergovernmental Conference (BIIGC). The BIIGC guarantees the Government of Ireland a say in areas of bilateral co-operation and on those matters not yet devolved to the Assembly or the North/South Ministerial Council.

Acts of the Northern Ireland Assembly as with other subordinate legislatures are subject to judicial review. A law can be struck down if it is found to:
 exceed the competences of the Assembly;
 violate retained European Union law;
 are incompatible with human rights as codified in the European Convention on Human Rights; or
 discriminate against individuals on the grounds of political opinion or religious belief.

Transferred matters
A transferred matter is defined as "any matter which is not an excepted or reserved matter". There is therefore no full listing of transferred matters but they have been grouped into the responsibilities of the Northern Ireland Executive ministers:
 Agriculture, Environment and Rural Affairs
 Communities
 Economy
 Education
 Finance
 Health
 Infrastructure
 Justice
 First and deputy First Minister

Reserved matters
Reserved matters are outlined in Schedule 3 of the Northern Ireland Act 1998:
 Navigation (including merchant shipping)
 Civil aviation
 The foreshore, sea bed and subsoil and their natural resources
 Postal services
 Import and export controls, external trade
 National minimum wage
 Financial services
 Financial markets
 Intellectual property
 Units of measurement
 Telecommunications, Broadcasting, Internet services
 The National Lottery
 Xenotransplantation
 Surrogacy
 Human fertilisation and embryology
 Human genetics
 Consumer safety in relation to goods

Excepted matters
Excepted matters are outlined in Schedule 2 of the Northern Ireland Act 1998:
 The Crown
 Parliament
 International relations
 Defence
 Immigration and Nationality
 Taxation
 National insurance
 Elections
 Currency
 National security
 Nuclear energy
 Outer space
 Activities in Antarctica

Procedure
The Assembly has three primary mechanisms to ensure effective power-sharing:
 in appointing ministers to the Executive (except for the Minister of Justice), the D'Hondt method is followed so that ministerial portfolios are divided among the parties in proportion to their strength in the Assembly. This means that all parties with a significant number of seats are entitled to at least one minister;
 certain resolutions must receive "cross community support", or the support of a minimum number of MLAs from both communities, to be passed by the Assembly. Every MLA is officially designated as either nationalist, unionist or other. The election of the speaker, appointment of the Minister of Justice, any changes to the standing orders and the adoption of certain money bills must all occur with cross-community support. The election of the First and deputy First Ministers previously occurred by parallel consent but the positions are now filled by appointment; and
 any vote taken by the Assembly can be made dependent on cross-community support if a petition of concern is presented to the speaker. A petition of concern may be brought by 30 or more MLAs. In such cases, a vote on proposed legislation will only pass if supported by a weighted majority (60%) of members voting, including at least 40% of each of the nationalist and unionist designations present and voting. Effectively this means that, provided enough MLAs from a given community agree, that community (or a sufficiently large party in that community) can exercise a veto over the Assembly's decisions. The purpose is to protect each community from legislation that would favour the other community.

The Assembly has the power to call for witnesses and documents, if the relevant responsibility has been transferred to its remit. Proceedings are covered by privilege in defamation law.

Composition
The Assembly's composition is laid down in the Northern Ireland Act 1998. It initially had 108 members (MLAs) elected from 18 six-member constituencies on the basis of universal adult suffrage and the single transferable vote.

Under the Assembly Members (Reduction of Numbers) Act (Northern Ireland) 2016 the number of MLAs per constituency was reduced from 6 to 5, leaving a total of 90 seats. This took effect at the March 2017 election. The constituencies used are the same as those used for elections to the United Kingdom Parliament at Westminster.

The Northern Ireland Act 1998 provides that, unless the Assembly is dissolved early, elections should occur once every four years on the first Thursday in May. The Northern Ireland (Miscellaneous Provisions) Act 2014 was passed to bring the Northern Ireland Assembly into line with the other devolved legislatures and to extend each Assembly term to five years instead of four. The second election to the Assembly was delayed by the UK government until 26 November 2003. The Assembly is dissolved shortly before the holding of elections on a day chosen by the Secretary of State. After each election the Assembly must meet within eight days. The Assembly can vote to dissolve itself early by a two-thirds majority of the total number of its members. It is also automatically dissolved if it is unable to elect a First Minister and deputy First Minister (effectively joint first ministers, the only distinction being in the titles) within six weeks of its first meeting or of those positions becoming vacant. There have been six elections to the Assembly since 1998.

Designations 
The Assembly uses a consociational system. Each MLA is free to designate themselves as "Nationalist", "Unionist", or "other", as they see fit, the only requirement being that no member may change their designation more than once during an Assembly session.

The system has been criticised by some, in particular the cross-community Alliance Party, as entrenching sectarian divisions. Alliance supports ending the official designation of identity requirement and the taking of important votes on the basis of an ordinary super-majority, as does the largest unionist party, the DUP.

Executive and Opposition
Which parties can appoint ministers to the Northern Ireland Executive is determined by a combination of mandatory coalition, the D'Hondt method and cross-community support, depending on the role, as explained above. Coalitions of between three and five parties have governed over the Assembly's history. The Executive of the Sixth Assembly was formed on 11 January 2020.

Unlike the United Kingdom Parliament and the Oireachtas (Irish Parliament), the Assembly had no provision for an official opposition to hold governing parties to account until legislation was passed in 2016. A party may now form or join an Assembly Opposition, granting it additional speaking, scrutiny and funding rights, if it was entitled to Ministerial roles under the D'Hondt method and declined them, or if it wins 8% or more of the seats. This opportunity was qualified for and taken by the UUP and SDLP following the 2016 election. Even within the Executive, however, the parties (which have collectively held large majorities in the Assembly) have frequently voted against each other due to political and/or policy differences.

Historical participation
Alongside independents, a total of 15 parties have held seats in the Assembly since 1998:

Unionist:
 Ulster Unionist Party
 Democratic Unionist Party
 Progressive Unionist Party
 UK Independence Party
 Traditional Unionist Voice
 NI21
 United Unionist Coalition
 UK Unionist Party
 Northern Ireland Unionist Party
Nationalist:
 Social Democratic and Labour Party
 Sinn Féin
Other:
 Alliance Party of Northern Ireland
 Green Party Northern Ireland
 People Before Profit
 Northern Ireland Women's Coalition

Election results and changes
The course of the Assembly saw a marked shift in party allegiance among voters. At the 2003 election, the DUP and Sinn Féin displaced the more moderate UUP and SDLP as the largest parties in the unionist and nationalist blocks. The parties only agreed to share power after four years of negotiations and a new election.

The DUP, Sinn Féin, SDLP and UUP have remained the largest parties in the Assembly and so far the only ones entitled to ministerial roles in the Executive under the D'Hondt method. However, there has been growing support for parties designated "Other". The centrist Alliance party secured the roles of Speaker from 1998 to 2007 and Minister of Justice from 2010 to 2016 (and again from 11 January 2020) thanks to cross-community support, and has seen an increase in its seat wins from 6 to 8. While the NI Women's Coalition disbanded in 2003, two leftist parties, the Green Party in Northern Ireland and People Before Profit, won their first seats, in 2007 and 2016, respectively.

A rapidly shifting landscape of smaller unionist parties has also been a feature of the Assembly. In 1999 the UK Unionist Party lost four of its five MLAs, disagreeing over a protest against Sinn Féin. The four formed the NI Unionist Party, which again suffered a split and won no seats in the 2003 election. That election also saw the electoral demise of a loose trio of independently elected unionists who had united as the United Unionist Coalition. Minor unionist parties flourished again after the 2011 election, which saw the disappearance of the PUP from the Assembly and the election of the TUV, a splinter group from the DUP opposed to the St Andrews Agreement. In 2012, a suspended UUP member became UKIP's first MLA, and in 2013, two UUP MLAs resigned to form the progressive NI21, which later split. Of these only the TUV survived the 2016 and 2017 elections.

Disagreements within the Executive precipitated the resignation of the UUP in 2015, and following the 2016 election they and the SDLP formed the first Assembly Opposition. The row also saw Alliance relinquish its Justice role, joining the Greens, PBPA and TUV in unofficial opposition. Independent unionist Claire Sugden gained the cross-community support needed to take over the Ministry of Justice.

An Executive was formed on 11 January 2020 following the 2017 election results, which saw the unionist block lose its Assembly majority for the first time. The usual four largest parties had won enough seats to win ministerial roles under D'Hondt (the DUP three, Sinn Féin two and the SDLP and UUP one each provided neither of them choose to enter opposition). With the reduction in the number of Assembly seats, the 8% threshold now amounts to eight rather than nine seats, qualifying Alliance to enter official opposition if they choose which they did not. The Greens retained their two seats and the TUV and Claire Sugden their single seats, while People Before Profit now held only one seat.

The table below details changes in members' allegiances and parties' seat possessions.

Co-options

Vacancies between Assembly elections are filled by co-option. A by-election is still available as an option if the nominated person cannot take his or her seat but none have been held.

The possibility of by-elections or co-options was established by the Northern Ireland Act 1998. In 2001, the Northern Ireland Office introduced a system of substitutes as the preferred option. Under a further change made in 2009, a political party leader directly nominates a new MLA if his or her party won that seat at the previous election. Independent MLAs can continue to use substitutes. 

When Sinn Féin MLA Michael Ferguson died in September 2006, no substitutes were available. Sinn Féin was allowed to use his vote in the Assembly (despite his death) and no by-election was held. His seat remained vacant until the 2007 Northern Ireland Assembly election.

Dáil Éireann, the lower house of the Oireachtas (Irish Parliament), uses the same single transferable vote system for elections as the Assembly but does allow by-elections to fill vacancies. This method is also used for the seats chosen by election in the upper house, Seanad Éireann.

Organisation
The Assembly is chaired by the speaker and three deputy speakers, of whom one is appointed Principal Deputy Speaker. Lord Alderdice served as the first speaker of the Assembly from July 1998, but retired in March 2004 to serve as a member of the Independent Monitoring Commission that supervised paramilitary ceasefires. The position is currently held by the Sinn Féin MLA Alex Maskey. In the Assembly, the speaker and ten other members constitute a quorum.

The Assembly Commission is the body corporate of the Assembly with all that that entails. It looks after the pay and pensions of members directly and through tax-payer funded appointees, and the interests of political parties. The very first bill of the Assembly was to do with members' pensions and was taken through with minimum ado by a member of the commission.

The Assembly has 9 statutory committees, each of which is charged with scrutinising the activities of a single ministerial department. It also has 6 permanent standing committees and can establish temporary ad hoc committees. The chairmen and deputy chairmen of the committees are chosen by party nominating officers under the d'Hondt system procedure, used to appoint most ministers. Ordinary committee members are not appointed under this procedure but the Standing Orders require that the share of members of each party on a committee should be roughly proportionate to its share of seats in the Assembly. Committees of the Assembly take decisions by a simple majority vote. The following are the current statutory and standing committees of the Assembly:

Statutory (departmental) committees
 Executive Office Committee
 Agriculture, Environment and Rural Affairs Committee
 Communities Committee
 Economy Committee
 Education Committee
 Finance Committee
 Health Committee
 Infrastructure Committee
 Justice Committee

Standing committees
 Assembly and Executive Review Committee
 Audit Committee
 Business Committee
 Procedures Committee
 Public Accounts Committee
 Standards and Privileges Committee

See also 
 Member of the Legislative Assembly (Northern Ireland)
 List of political parties in Northern Ireland
 2022 Northern Ireland Assembly election
 Members of the 7th Northern Ireland Assembly
 Scottish Parliament
 Senedd
 Oireachtas

References

External links
 
 The St Andrews' Agreement The latest attempt to restore devolution to Northern Ireland.
 Northern Ireland Act 1998 – Full text.
 Standing Orders of the Northern Ireland Assembly – HTML and PDF versions available on the Northern Ireland Assembly.
 Northern Ireland Assembly awards outsourcing contract, brayleinobroadskill.co.uk; accessed 14 May 2016. website.

 
The Troubles (Northern Ireland)
1973 establishments in Northern Ireland
1974 disestablishments in Northern Ireland
1982 establishments in Northern Ireland
1986 disestablishments in Northern Ireland
1998 establishments in Northern Ireland
Politics of Northern Ireland
History of Belfast
Northern Ireland
Northern Ireland